Tunisia (TUN) competed at the 1975 Mediterranean Games in Algiers, Algeria.

Nations at the 1975 Mediterranean Games
1975
Mediterranean Games